Saudi Investment Bank Tower (also known as Al-Falak Tower) is a skyscraper located in the city of Khobar, Saudi Arabia. It is located on King Abdul Aziz Road in the growing business district of Tahila in Khobar. It is the second tallest building in Khobar, after Hugayat Tower. It was constructed in 1998, and the total cost of the project was US$75 million. As there is no skyscraper around it, it creates a silhouetted skyline in the evening.

External links
View in the evening
Falak Tower from corniche (left)
Photo on Emporis

Khobar